The Central Park jogger case (sometimes termed the Central Park Five case) was a criminal case concerning the assault and rape of Trisha Meili, a white woman in Central Park in Manhattan, New York, on April 19, 1989. On the night of the attack, a group of around 30 teenagers had entered the park; some members of the group committed a string of other attacks. Five black and Latino youths (known as the Central Park Five, later the Exonerated Five) were convicted of assaulting the woman, and served sentences ranging from six to twelve years. All later had their charges vacated after a prison inmate, serial rapist Matias Reyes confessed to the crime and DNA evidence confirmed his involvement.

From the outset the case was a topic of national interest. Initially, it fueled public discourse about New York City's perceived lawlessness, criminal behavior by youths, and violence toward women. After the exonerations, the case became a prominent example of racial profiling, discrimination, and inequality in the legal system and the media. All five defendants sued the City of New York for malicious prosecution, racial discrimination, and emotional distress; the city settled the suit in 2014 for $41 million.

Attacks 

At 9:00p.m. on April 19, 1989, a group of an estimated 30 to 32 teenagers who lived in East Harlem entered Manhattan's Central Park at an entrance in Harlem, near Central Park North. Some of the group committed several attacks, assaults, and robberies against people who were either walking, biking, or jogging in the northernmost part of the park  near the reservoir, and victims began to report the incidents to police.

Within the North Woods, between 102nd and 105th Street, assailants were reported  attacking several bicyclists, hurling rocks at a cab, and attacking a pedestrian, whom they robbed of his food and beer and left unconscious. The teenagers roamed south along the park's East Drive and the 97th Street transverse, between 9:00 and 10:00p.m. Police attempted to apprehend suspects after crimes began to be reported between 9:00 and 10:00p.m. Michael Vigna, a competitive bike rider, testified that, at about 9:05 p.m., he was hassled by a group of boys, one of whom tried to punch him. At about 9:15 p.m., Antonio Diaz, who had been walking in the park near 105th Street, was knocked to the ground by teenagers, who stole his bag of food and bottle of beer. And Gerald Malone and Patricia Dean, riding on a tandem bike, said that a group of boys tried to block their path on East Drive south of 102nd Street at about 9:15 p.m.; Malone said that he and Dean sped towards the boys, causing them to scatter, though Dean said that a few grabbed at her;the couple called police after reaching a call box.

At least some of the group of teenagers traveled farther south to the area around the reservoir, and, there, four male joggers were "set upon" between 9:25 and 9:50p.m.  David Lewis testified that he was attacked and robbed about 9:25–9:40p.m. Robert Garner said he was assaulted at about 9:30p.m. David Good testified he was attacked at about 9:47p.m. And, between 9:40 and 9:50, John Loughlin was "knocked to the ground, kicked, punched, and beaten with a pipe and stick"; he sustained "significant but not life-threatening injuries". At a pretrial hearing in October 1989, a police officer testified that when Loughlin was found, he was bleeding so badly that he "looked like he was dunked in a bucket of blood".

Sexual assault of Trisha Melli

29-year-old Patricia "Trisha" Ellen Meili was going for a regular run in Central Park shortly before 9:00p.m. She was raped and beaten almost to death. About four hours later at 1:30 am, she was found naked, gagged, and tied, and covered in mud and blood in a shallow ravine in a wooded area of the park about 300 feet north of the path called the 102nd Street Crossing. The first policeman who saw her said: "She was beaten as badly as anybody I've ever seen beaten. She looked like she was tortured." Meili was so badly injured that she was in a coma for 12 days. She had severe hypothermia, severe brain damage, severe hemorrhagic shock, loss of 75–80 percent of her blood, and internal bleeding. Her skull had been fractured so badly that her left eye was dislodged from its socket, which in turn was fractured in 21 places, and she also had facial fractures.

It was not until 1:30a.m. that night that Melli was found in the North Woods area of the park. She had been pulled to the north some 300 feet off the path known as the 102nd Street Crossing. The path of her feet dragged through the grass was marked so clearly that it could be photographed. It was 18 inches wide. There was no evidence in the grass of footprints of multiple perpetrators. She was brutally beaten, suffering major blood loss and skull fractures; she was later revealed to have been raped.

After her discovery, the police increased the intensity of their effort to identify suspects in this attack and took more teenagers into custody. The jogger was not identified for about 24 hours, and it took days for the police to retrace her movements of that night. By the time of the trial of the first three suspects in June 1990, The New York Times characterized the attack on the jogger as "one of the most widely publicized crimes of the 1980's".

Arrests and investigation 
Because it was initially determined that Melli would likely die from her injuries, the police treated the attack as a probable homicide.

Arrests of youths 
The police were dispatched at 9:30p.m. and responded with scooters and unmarked cars. Through the night, they apprehended about 20 teenagers. They took custody of Raymond Santana and Kevin Richardson, both 14 years of age, along with three other teenagers at approximately 10:15p.m. on Central Park West and 102nd Street. Steven Lopez, 14, was arrested with this group within an hour of the several attacks that were first reported to police. He was also interrogated.

The severely beaten Meili was not found until 1:30a.m. on April 20. Her discovery increased the urgency of police efforts to apprehend suspects. Antron McCray, 15; Yusef Salaam, 15; and Korey Wise (then known as Kharey Wise), 16, were brought in for questioning later that day (April 20), after having been identified by other youths in the large group as participants in or present at some of the attacks on other victims. Korey Wise said he had not been involved, and accompanied Salaam because they were friends. These were the six suspects indicted for the attack on the female jogger (later identified as Meili).

Police took into custody no fewer than fourteen other suspects over the next few days, and arrested a total of ten suspects who were ultimately tried for the attacks. Among them were four African American and two Hispanic American teenagers who were indicted on May 10 on charges of assault, robbery, riot, rape, sexual abuse, and the attempted murders of Meili and an unrelated man by the name of John Loughlin.

Over the 48-hour period of time subsequent to the events of the night of April 19, police arrested additional suspects and interrogated numerous others. Among these was Clarence Thomas, 14, who was arrested on April 21, 1989, on charges related to the rape of the female jogger. After further investigation, he was never indicted, and all charges were dismissed against him on October 31, 1989. Also arrested in this period on charges of attacks against other persons in the park, and later indicted, were Jermaine Robinson, 15; Antonio Montalvo, 18; and Orlando Escobar, 16.

Confessions

The videotaped confessions started on April 21, after the detectives finished unrecorded interrogations during which the five suspects were in custody for at least seven hours. Santana, McCray, and Richardson made video statements in the presence of parents. Wise made several statements unaccompanied by any parent, guardian or counsel. Lopez was interviewed on videotape in the presence of his parents on April 21, 1989, beginning at 3:30a.m. He named others of the group by first names in the group attacks on other persons but denied any knowledge of the female jogger. None of the six had defense attorneys during the interrogations or videotape process. The five told police they had been part of a makeshift group of about 30 people, some of whom had committed various crimes, some of who had merely observed those crimes. According to a later statement by District Attorney Nancy Ryan, "[a]ll five implicated the themselves in a number of the crimes which had occurred in the park.". 

While the accounts offered of the crimes beside the rape were accurate, their accounts of the rape contained discrepancies as to "when, where and how it happened." Only Wise made any statement about the different times and locations of the jogger attack, and detectives had taken Wise to the park to observe the crime scene before he made his videotaped confession. None of the five said that he had raped the jogger, but each confessed to having been an accomplice—each youth said that he had only helped restrain the jogger, or touched her, while one or more others had raped her. Their confessions varied as to who they identified as having participated in the rape, including naming several youths who were never questioned. In his untaped confession, Salaam went the furthest in admitting some culpability, claiming to have struck the jogger with a pipe at the beginning of the incident.

Although four suspects (all except Salaam) confessed on videotape in the presence of a parent or guardian (who had generally not been present during the interrogations), each of the four retracted his statement within weeks. Together they claimed that they had been intimidated, lied to, and coerced by police into making false confessions. While the confessions were videotaped, the hours of interrogation that preceded the confessions were not.

When taken into custody, Salaam told the police he was 16 years old and showed them identification to that effect. If a suspect had reached 16 years of age, his parents or guardians no longer had a right to accompany him during police questioning, or to refuse to permit him to answer any questions.  After Salaam's mother arrived at the station, she insisted that she wanted a lawyer for her son, and the police stopped the questioning. He neither made a videotape nor signed the earlier written statement, but the court ruled to accept it as evidence before his trial. Detective Tom McKenna falsely told Salam that his fingerprints had been found on the victim's clothing; McKenna reported that Salaam subsequently confessed to being present at the scene of the rape. Years later, Salaam said, "I would hear them beating up Korey Wise in the next room", and "they would come and look at me and say: 'You realize you're next.' The fear made me feel really like I was not going to be able to make it out."

None of the defendants had legal counsel during questioning. Many consider the interrogation techniques to have been coercive and they have been subject to wide criticism. Within weeks, they each withdrew their confessions, pleaded not guilty, and refused plea deals on the rape and assault charges.

April 21 press conference
On April 21, senior police investigators held a press conference to announce having apprehended about 20 suspects in the attacks of a total of nine people in Central Park two nights before and began to offer their theory of the attack and rape of the female jogger. Her name was withheld as a victim of a sex crime. The police said up to 12 youths were believed to have attacked the jogger.

The main suspects were a sub-group within the loose gang of 30 to 32 teenagers who had assaulted strangers in the park as part of an activity that the police said the teenagers referred to as "wilding". New York City senior detectives said the term was used by the suspects when describing their actions to police. The police described the attacks as "random" and "motiveless", saying they had "terrorized" people in the park. This account of the term "wilding" was soon disputed by investigative reporter Barry Michael Cooper, who said that it originated in a police detective's misunderstanding of the suspects' use of the phrase "doing the wild thing", lyrics from rapper Tone Loc's hit song "Wild Thing".

Media coverage
At a time of concern about crime in general in the city, which was suffering high rates of assaults, rapes, and homicides, these attacks provoked great outrage, particularly the brutal rape of the female jogger. It took place in the public park that is "mythologized as the city's verdant, democratic refuge". New York Governor Mario Cuomo told the New York Post: "This is the ultimate shriek of alarm."

Normal police procedures stipulated that the names of criminal suspects under the age of 16 were to be withheld from the media and the public. But this policy was ignored when the names of the arrested juveniles were released to the press before any of them had been formally arraigned or indicted. For example, the name of Kharey Wise (he later adopted the use of Korey as his first name) was published in an April 25, 1989, article in the Philadelphia Daily News about the attack on the female jogger.

By that time, more information had been published about the primary suspects in the rape, who did not seem to satisfy typical profiles of perpetrators. Reporters had found that some came from stable, financially secure families; police had ruled out drugs or major robbery, and most had no criminal records. On April 26, 1989, The New York Times published a cautionary editorial against the use of labels and questioning why such "well-adjusted youngsters" could have committed such a "savage" crime.

After the major media's decisions to print the names, photos, and addresses of the juvenile suspects, they and their families received serious threats. Other residents living at the Schomburg Plaza, where four suspects lived, were also threatened. Because of this, editors of The City Sun and the Amsterdam News chose to use Meili's name in their continuing coverage of the events. Reverend Calvin O. Butts of the Abyssinian Baptist Church in Harlem, who came to support the five suspects, said to The New York Times, "The first thing you do in the United States of America when a white woman is raped is round up a bunch of black youths, and I think that's what happened here."

In most media accounts of the incident at that time, Meili was simply referred to as the "Central Park Jogger", but two local TV stations violated the media policy of not publicly identifying the victims of sex crimes and released her name in the days immediately following the attack. Two newspapers aimed at the African American community—The City Sun and the Amsterdam News—and the black-owned talk radio station WLIB continued to cover the case as it progressed. Their editors said this was in response to the media having publicized the names and personal information about the five suspects, who were all minors before they were arraigned. The Open Line hosts on WRKS were credited with helping continue to cover the case until the convicted youths were cleared in 2002 of the crime.

On May 1, 1989, at the time a real estate called for the return of the death penalty for murder in full-page advertisements published in all four of the city's major newspapers. Trump said he wanted the "criminals of every age [who were accused of beating and raping the jogger in Central Park twelve days earlier] to be afraid". The advertisement, which cost an estimated , said, in part,

According to a contemporaneous article in the New York Amsterdam News, the ad was "widely condemned", including by then-Mayor Koch. Colin Moore, one of the attorneys defending one of the Central Park defendants, said that the ad "proved that anything is possible in America", and that "even a fool can become a multi-millionaire." According to defendant Yusef Salaam, quoted in a February 2016 article in The Guardian, Trump "was the fire starter" in 1989, as "common citizens were being manipulated and swayed into believing that we were guilty." Salaam said his family received death threats after papers ran Trump's full-page ad urging the death penalty.

Criminal actions against McCray, Richardson, Salaam, Wise, and Lopez
The prosecutor planned to try the defendants in two groups and then scheduled the sixth defendant to be tried last. The latter pleaded guilty in January 1991 on lesser charges and received a reduced sentence.

Indictments

May 4, 1989
 Michael Briscoe, 17, was initially arrested for the rape of the female jogger, but his indictment was for riot and assault related to the attack of David Lewis, one of the four male joggers near the reservoir. In a plea deal arranged in June 1990, he pleaded guilty to assault and was immediately sentenced to a year in prison, with credit for time served.
 Jermaine Robinson, 15, was indicted on multiple counts of robbery and assault in the attacks on Lewis and John Loughlin, another jogger near the reservoir. In a plea deal, he pleaded guilty on October 5, 1989, to the robbery of Loughlin and was sentenced to a year in a juvenile facility.

May 10, 1989
Six youths were indicted with attempted murder and other charges in the attack on and rape of the female jogger, and additional charges related to the attack of David Lewis, the attack and robbery of John Loughlin, and riot:
 Steven Lopez, 14,
 Antron McCray, 15
 Kevin Richardson, 14,
 Yusef Salaam, 15,
 Raymond Santana, 14, 
 Korey Wise, 16.

Each of the youths pleaded "not guilty". The families of Lopez, Richardson, and Salaam were able to make the $25,000 bail imposed by the court. The two other youths under 16 were returned to a juvenile facility to be held there until trial. Classified as an adult at 16, Korey Wise was separated from the others from the first and held in an adult jail at Rikers Island until trial.

Four of the six youths who were indicted for the rape lived at the Schomburg Plaza, 1309 Fifth Avenue, at the northeast corner of Central Park near 110th Street; two lived further north of there. The ones at Schomburg included friends Salaam and Wise, who lived in the northwest tower, and Kevin Richardson and Steven Lopez who lived elsewhere in the complex. They had seen each other in the neighborhood. The Schomburg was a large, mixed-income complex with two 35-story towers and an associated multi-story rectangular building. Designed for families, the complex was built in 1974 and was partially subsidized by the city and federal government; it had 600 households, in apartments ranging in size from studios to five bedrooms.

January 10, 1990
 Orlando Escobar, 16, was indicted for three counts of robbery, two counts of assault, and one count of riot-related to the attack on John Loughlin. In a plea deal, he pleaded guilty on March 14, 1991, to attempted robbery in second degree, and was sentenced to 6 months' incarceration and  years' probation.
 Antonio Montalvo, 18, was charged with two counts of robbery and one of assault, related to the attack on Antonio Diaz. In a plea deal, he pleaded guilty on January 29, 1991, to a robbery in second degree, and was sentenced to 1 year.

Pre-trial hearings 

Numerous pretrial hearings were conducted by Judge Thomas B. Galligan of the State Supreme Court of Manhattan, who had been assigned the case. Since 1986, judges were generally assigned by lottery, but the court administrator assigned him to this case. The defense attorneys criticized Galligan as being biased toward the assistant district attorney and handing down tough sentences. The counsel of the defendants filed a motion for a different judge which was rejected. In one of the pre-trial hearings, on February 23, 1990, Galligan ruled that he would accept the videotaped confessions and Salaam's unsigned statement as prosecution evidence at trial, despite defense counsel's objections. He said that Salaam's statement was being admitted as evidence because Salaam had lied to police about his age and showed them false identification.

Analysis indicated that none of the suspects' DNA matched either of the two DNA samples collected from the crime scene (from the jogger's cervix and running sock), but results were reported as "inconclusive" by the police.

Trials
In 1990 the six suspects (including Steven Lopez) indicted in the attack on the female jogger and other crimes were scheduled for trial. The prosecution arranged to try the six defendants in the Meili case in two separate groups. This enabled them to control the order in which certain evidence would be introduced to the court.

Lopez was scheduled to be tried in January 1991, after the two other groups of defendants in the rape and assault case. He had denied any knowledge of the rape in his videotaped confession, but was implicated by other defendants' statements. Like the five others, he was also indicted on charges related to the attack and robbery of Loughlin.

First trial 
In the first trial, which began June 25 and ended on August 18, 1990, defendants Antron McCray, Yusef Salaam, and Raymond Santana were tried. Each of the teenagers had his own defense counsel. The jury consisted of four white Americans, four black Americans, three Hispanic Americans, and one Asian American. Meili testified at the trial, but her identity was not given to the court. None of the three defense attorneys cross-examined her.

The jury deliberated for 10 days before rendering its verdict on August 18. Each of the three youths was acquitted of attempted murder, but convicted of assault and rape of the female jogger, and convicted of assault and robbery of John Loughlin, a male jogger who was badly beaten that night in Central Park. Salaam and McCray were 15 years old, and Santana 14 years old, at the time of the crime. As such, they were each sentenced by Judge Thomas B. Galligan to the maximum allowed for juveniles, 5–10 years each in a youth correctional facility.

Second trial 
The second trial, of Kevin Richardson and Korey Wise, began October 22, 1990 and also lasted about two months, ending in December. Kevin Richardson, 14 years old at the time of the crime, had been free on $25,000 bail before the trial.

Assistant District Attorney Elizabeth Lederer had a lengthy opening statement, and Wise broke down at the defense table after it, weeping and shouting that she had lied. He was removed temporarily from the courtroom. Richardson's defense counsel made a motion for a mistrial, because of the potential effect on the jury, but the judge rejected it. The trial proceeded.

The defense attorneys noted that each youth had limited intellectual ability and said that neither was capable of preparing the written statements or videotaped confessions submitted by the prosecution as evidence. They contended that the confessions had been coerced from youths vulnerable to pressure because of their age and their intellectual capacity.

Meili testified again at this trial; again, her name was not given in court. This time one of the defense counsels, Wise's lawyer, cross-examined her. She later said in an interview on Oprah: "I'll tell you what—I didn't feel wonderful about the boys' defense attorneys, especially the one who cross-examined me. He was right in front of my face and, in essence, calling me a slut by asking questions like 'When's the last time you had sex with your boyfriend?'" Wise's lawyer had also asked her whether she had ever been assaulted by men in her life, suggested that a man she knew may have attacked her, and implied that her injuries were not as severe as they had been presented.

Richardson was the only one of the five defendants to be convicted of attempted murder of Meili, in addition to sodomy and assault of her, and robbery and riot in the attack on John Loughlin, another jogger in the park. He was sentenced to 5–10 years in a juvenile facility.

Korey Wise, 16 years old at the time of the crime, was acquitted of rape and attempted murder. At trial, Melody Jackson—the sister of one of Wise's friends—testified that while incarcerated in the Rikers Island he had told her that he had restrained and fondled the jogger. Wise was convicted of lesser charges of sexual abuse, assault, and riot in the attack on the female jogger and on Loughlin. Because of his age and the violent nature of the felony charge, he was tried and sentenced as an adult, receiving 5–15 years in adult prison. After the verdict, Wise shouted at the prosecutor: "You're going to pay for this. Jesus is going to get you. You made this up."

Jurors who agreed to interviews after the trials said that they were not convinced by the youths' confessions, but were impressed by the physical evidence introduced by the prosecutors: semen, grass, dirt, and two hairs described as "consistent with" the victim's hair that were recovered from Richardson's underpants.

According to an FBI expert who gave evidence at the trial, all five defendants could be excluded as being the man who had left the semen samples inside Meili and on a sock. In total, 14 men were tested, including the defendants and Meili's former boyfriend, and all were excluded. The semen belonged to another, unidentified male. Years later, more advanced DNA testing also revealed that the hairs in Richardson's clothes did not match the victim.

Sentencing and appeals
After the guilty verdicts, the judge sentenced the defendants to the maximum for the charges and their ages. The four youths under 16 were sentenced to 5–10 years each. They had been held in a juvenile facility since their arrest. Wise at 16 was tried and sentenced as an adult because of the nature of the violent felony charges against him, under the Juvenile Offender Law of 1978. He was sentenced to 5–15 years.

Four of the five all but appealed their convictions in the rape case the following year, but each of the convictions was upheld.

The sentences each of them served is as follows:
 Yusef Salaam served 6 years and 8 months in juvenile detention from 1990 to 1996 and was released on parole.
 Raymond Santana served 6 years and 8 months in juvenile detention from 1990 to 1996 and was released on parole. In 1998, he violated his parole and was sentenced to –7 years' prison on drug charges. He was released and exonerated in 2002.
 Kevin Richardson served 7 years in juvenile detention from 1990 to 1997 and was released on parole.
 Antron McCray was sentenced to 5–10 years in juvenile detention. He served 6 years from 1990 to 1996 and was released on parole.
 Korey Wise was sentenced to 6–15 years in prison on sexual abuse, assault and riot. He served 13 years and 8 months in multiple New York state prisons: Rikers Island in 1990, Attica in 1991, Wende in 1993, and Auburn in 2001. At Auburn prison Wise would meet one Matias Reyes, who in 2002 was to confess to being the one who was actually guilty of the assault and rape of Meili, which would pave the way for Wise's exoneration in 2002.

On appeal, Salaam's attorneys charged that he had been held by police without access to parents or guardians. The majority appellate court decision upheld his conviction, noting that Salaam had initially lied to police about his age, claiming to be 16 and backing up his claim with a forged transit pass that, falsely, indicated that he was 16. This was the age at which a suspect could be questioned without a parent or guardian present. When Salaam informed police of his true age, they allowed his mother entry to the interrogation room.

Criticism of the jury verdicts

In a 2016 Guardian article, defense counsel William Warren was reported saying that he thought Trump's ads in 1989 had played a role in securing conviction by the juries, saying that "he poisoned the minds of many people who lived in New York City and who, rightfully, had a natural affinity for the victim." He noted, "Notwithstanding the jurors' assertions that they could be fair and impartial, some of them or their families, who naturally have influence, had to be affected by the inflammatory rhetoric in the ads." In 2019 Time magazine also assessed Trump's ads in 1989 as having adversely affected the case for the defendants.

In a 1991 New York Review of Books article, which was the first mainstream piece arguing that the Five's convictions had been wrongful, Joan Didion suggested the verdicts stemmed from a cultural crisis, writing that "So fixed were the emotions provoked by this case that the idea that there could have been, for even one juror, even a moment's doubt in the state's case ... seemed, to many in the city, bewildering, almost unthinkable: the attack on the jogger had by then passed into narrative, and the narrative was ... about what was wrong with the city and about its solution".

Lopez's plea and sentencing
Although Assistant District Attorney Elizabeth Lederer had said she would not accept a plea deal for any of the defendants indicted in the rape case, she did come to agreement with Steven Lopez and his attorney in the court on January 30, 1991, prior to a new jury being selected for his trial. He was considered the final of the six defendants in the jogger trial. Because Lopez had not acknowledged participating at all in the rape in his statement to police, and prosecution witnesses had withdrawn from testifying, based on what they said was fear of self-incrimination or "fear [for] their own safety", according to Lederer, the prosecution's case was extremely weak.

After agreeing to the plea deal, Judge Galligan allowed Lopez to remain free on $25,000 bail until sentencing. Because Lopez was younger than 16 at the time of the crime, he was sentenced to serve his time in a juvenile facility.

Serving time
The four youngest of the five convicted defendants each served between six and seven years in juvenile facilities. Richardson, Salaam, and Santana attended classes. Each earned a GED and also completed an associate degree while there.

Richardson and Salaam were released in 1997. Afterward Salaam talked about how important family was. He was part of an Islamic community and served as a spiritual leader at his youth facility, but talked about how important his mother's visits had been. He was held at a juvenile facility in upstate New York about five miles from the Canadian border and hours from New York City, but she came to see him three times a week.

Wise had to serve all of his time in adult prison, and encountered so much personal violence that he asked to stay in isolation for extended periods. He was held at four different prisons, having asked for transfers in the hope of improving his situation. He was released in August 2002, the last of the five men to leave prison.

Through this period, each of the five continued to maintain their innocence in the rape and attack of Meili, including at hearings before parole boards. While they acknowledged "witnessing or participating in other wrongdoing" in the park, they each maintained innocence in the attack of Meili.

Discovery of assailant 

In 2001, convicted serial rapist and murderer Matias Reyes was serving a life sentence in New York state. He had never been identified as a suspect in the Central Park attack on Meili, although he had been at large at the time. Reyes was believed to have raped another woman in the same area of the park during the day on April 17, two days before the attack on Meili. Initially the Meili case was investigated as a homicide, and the April 17 rape was investigated as a rape assault, which resulted in a lack of comparison of the DNA recovered in the two cases. The NYPD did not have a DNA database until 1994; after that, detectives and prosecutors had access to common information about DNA from evidence and taken from suspects in certain crimes. During the summer of 1989, Reyes raped four more women, killing one, and was interrupted after robbing a fifth.

In 2001 Reyes met Wise when they were held at the Auburn Correctional Facility in upstate New York. That year, Reyes informed a corrections officer that he had raped Meili. In 2002, Reyes told officials that on the night of April 19, 1989, he had assaulted and raped the female jogger. He was 17 years old at the time of the assault and said that he had committed it alone. He also said that he had intended to burglarize the victim's apartment. Reyes was then working at an East Harlem convenience store on Third Avenue and 102nd Street, and living in a van on the street.

District Attorney Robert Morgenthau's office was notified of the confession in 2002. Morgenthau appointed a team led by Assistant District Attorneys Nancy Ryan and Peter Casolaro to investigate the case, based on Reyes's confession and a review of evidence. Reyes provided officials with a detailed account of the attack, details of which were corroborated by other evidence which the police held. In addition, his DNA matched the DNA evidence at the scene, confirming that he was the sole source of the semen found in and on the victim "to a factor of one in 6,000,000,000 people". Reyes' DNA matched the semen found on Meili, and he provided other confirmatory evidence. In announcing these facts, Morgenthau also said that the perpetrator had tied up Meili with her T-shirt in a distinctive fashion that Reyes used again on later victims in crimes for which he was convicted.

Based on interviews and other evidence, the team believed that Reyes had acted alone: The rape appeared to have taken place in the North Woods area after the main body of the thirty teenagers had moved well to the south, and the timeline reconstruction of events made it unlikely that he was joined by any of the defendants. In addition, Reyes was not known to have been associated with any of the six indicted defendants. He lived at 102nd Street, in what locals considered another neighborhood. None of the six defendants in the rape mentioned him by name in association with the rape.

Reyes' confession occurred after the statute of limitations had passed and the Central Park Five had already served their sentences. Reyes claimed he came forward because "it was the right thing to do". At the time of his confession, Reyes had been convicted and sentenced to life in state prison for raping and robbing four other women in the summer of 1989, murdering one of them and robbing another. In a plea deal, he pleaded guilty to the top counts in each of the five cases on November 1, 1991.

Vacatur of prior convictions

Based on the newly discovered evidence, Wise, McCray, Santana, Richardson, and Salaam filed motions to have their convictions set aside and for the court "to grant whatever further relief may be just and proper." In late 2002,  Robert Morgenthau, District Attorney for New York County, conducted an investigation into the potential innocence of Wise, McCray, Santana, Richardson, and Salaam. The DA's office questioned the veracity of the confessions, pointing to the many inconsistencies between them and their lack of correspondence to established facts. Nancy Ryan, an ADA in Morgenthau's office, filed an affirmation supporting motions by the defendants to vacate their convictions in December 2002:

In addition to the confessions, the filing noted that a "reconstruction of the events in the park has bared a significant conflict, one that was hinted at but not explored in depth at the trials: at the time the jogger was believed to have been attacked, the teenagers were said to be involved—either as spectators or participants—in muggings elsewhere in the park." Ryan continued: "Ultimately, there proved to be no physical or forensic evidence recovered at the scene or from the person or effects of the victim which connected the defendants to the attack on the jogger, or could establish how many perpetrators participated."

DNA analysis of the strands of hair found on the clothing of two of the defendants, conducted with advanced technology not available at the time of their trial, established that the hair did not belong to the victim, despite what the prosecution had claimed at trial.

Morgenthau recommended vacating the convictions of the five defendants who had been convicted and sentenced to prison. And, in light of the "extraordinary circumstances" of the case, Ryan's affirmation further recommended that the court also vacate the convictions for the other crimes, including robbery and assault, to which the defendants had confessed. Given that the defendants' confessions to the other crimes were made at the same time and in the same statements as those related to the attack on Meili, the DA's office argued that, had the newly discovered evidence been available at the original trials, it could have caused juries to question the defendants' confessions in those crimes as well.

The DA's recommendation to vacate the convictions was, and continues to be strongly opposed by lead detectives on the case and other members of the police department. Police Commissioner Raymond Kelly complained at the time that Morgenthau's staff had denied his detectives access to "important evidence" needed to conduct a thorough investigation.

The five defendants' convictions were vacated by New York Supreme Court Justice Charles J. Tejada on December 19, 2002. As Morgenthau recommended, Tejada's order vacated the convictions for all the crimes of which the defendants had been convicted. All five of the defendants had completed their prison sentences at the time of Tejada's order; their names were cleared in relation to this case. This also enabled them being removed from New York State's sex offender registry. In addition to having had difficulty getting employment or renting housing, as registered offenders, they had been required to report to authorities in person every three months. The city government also withdrew all charges against the men. Meili later commented that she wished the matter would have been retried, rather than settled out of court, and that she believed her attack was not the result of a single person.

Linda Fairstein, who directed the original prosecution, agreed with the decision to vacate the rape charges but said the separate assault charges should have remained. Morgenthau would later express regret assigning the case to Fairstein, saying "I had complete confidence in Linda Fairstein. Turned out to be misplaced. But we rectified it."

On July 25, 2022, Steven Lopez's robbery conviction was overturned, and the indictment against him dismissed after District Attorney Alvin Bragg filed a motion to vacate. According to Bragg, "Mr. Lopez was charged and pleaded guilty in the face of false statements, unreliable forensic analysis and immense external pressure."

Aftermath
Lawyers for the five defendants repeated their assessment that Trump's advertisements in 1989 had inflamed public opinion about the case. After Reyes confessed to the crime and said he acted alone, defense counselor Michael W. Warren said, "I think Donald Trump at the very least owes a real apology to this community and to the young men and their families." Protests were held outside Trump Tower in October 2002 with protestors chanting, "Trump is a chump!" Trump did not apologize.

Armstrong Report

Following these events, in 2002, New York City Police Commissioner Raymond Kelly commissioned a panel to review the case, "To determine whether the new evidence [from the Reyes affidavit and related evidence, and Morgenthau's investigation] indicated that police supervisors or officers acted improperly or incorrectly, and to determine whether police policy or procedures needed to be changed as a result of the Central Park jogger case." The panel was chaired by attorney Michael F. Armstrong, the former chief counsel to the Knapp Commission, which in 1972 had documented widespread corruption in the NYPD. Two other attorneys were included: Jules Martin, a former police officer and now New York University Vice President; and Stephen Hammerman, deputy police commissioner for legal affairs. The panel issued a 43-page report in January 2003.

In its January 2003 Armstrong Report, the panel "did not dispute the legal necessity of setting aside the convictions of the five defendants based on the new DNA evidence that Mr. Reyes had raped the jogger." But it disputed acceptance of Reyes's claim that he alone had raped the jogger. It said there was "nothing but his uncorroborated word" that he acted alone. Armstrong said the panel believed "the word of a serial rapist killer is not something to be heavily relied upon."

The report concluded that the five men whose convictions had been vacated had "most likely" participated in the beating and rape of the jogger and that the "most likely scenario" was that "both the defendants and Reyes assaulted her, perhaps successively." The report said Reyes had most likely "either joined in the attack as it was ending or waited until the defendants had moved on to their next victims before descending upon her himself, raping her and inflicting upon her the brutal injuries that almost caused her death."

Despite the analysis conducted by the District Attorney's Office, New York City detectives supported the 2003 Armstrong Report by the police department. The panel said there had been "no misconduct in the 1989 investigation of the Central Park jogger case".

As to the five defendants, the report said:

Edward Conlon, a writer and former New York police officer, said that Armstrong, "[i]n support of his assessment, . . . offers a number of tantalizing theories, only partially undergirded by fully explored evidence."  the Armstrong Report as "resembl[ing] a defense document more than a prosecution brief in its approach, throwing everything against the wall to see what sticks," finding "[s]ome parts are stickier than others."

Lawsuits against New York City
In 2003, Kevin Richardson, Raymond Santana Jr., and Antron McCray sued the City of New York for malicious prosecution, racial discrimination, and emotional distress. The other two defendants later joined the lawsuit. Under Michael Bloomberg's mayoral administration, the city refused to pursue a settlement for the lawsuits based on a conclusion that the defendants had had a fair trial.

Speaking at a news conference in 2002, Bloomberg spoke of his confidence regarding the actions of the police department. "As far as I can tell, the N.Y.P.D. did exactly what they should have done a number of years ago when the terrible incident took place ... If we see any reason to think that we acted inappropriately, [Police] Commissioner Kelly will certainly take appropriate measures. But so far we believe that the N.Y.P.D. did act appropriately."

In 2011, Celeste Koeleveld, then New York City's Executive Assistant Corporation Counsel for Public Safety, gave a public statement on behalf of the city in 2011 after receiving public criticism from Councilman Charles Barron for failing to resolve the lawsuits:After a change in city administration, with the election of Mayor Bill de Blasio (who had run on a campaign promise to resolve the matter), the city settled in 2014 with the five defendants for $41 million. At a press conference in 2014, de Blasio made a public statement about the settlements.In 2016, the five men received an award of $3.9 million against the State of New York for additional damages caused by the economic and emotional devastation caused by their incarceration. The original lawsuit had requested $51 million in addition to the previously awarded $41 million.

Settlements and reaction

Under newly elected Mayor Bill de Blasio, New York City announced a settlement in June 2014 in the case for about $40 million. Santana, Salaam, McCray, and Richardson each received around $7.1 million from the city for their years in prison, while Wise received $12.2 million because he had served six additional years. The city did not admit to any wrongdoing in the settlement. The settlement averaged roughly $1 million for each year of imprisonment that each of the men had served.

As of December 2014, the five men were pursuing an additional $52 million in damages from New York State in the New York Court of Claims, before Judge Alan Marin. Speaking of the second suit, against the state, Santana said: "When you have a person who has been exonerated of a crime, the city provides no services to transition him back to society. The only thing left is something like this—so you can receive some type of money so you can survive." They received a total settlement of $3.9 million from the state in 2016, with varying amounts related to the period of time that each man had served in prison.

In 2014, after New York City had settled the wrongful conviction suit, some figures returned to the media to dispute the court's 2002 decision to vacate the convictions. Also retired New York City detective Edward Conlon, who had been involved with the case, in an article published in October 2014 in The Daily Beast, quoted incriminatory statements allegedly made by some of the youths after they had been taken into custody by police in April 1989.

Similarly, two doctors who had treated Meili after the attack said in 2014, after the settlement, that some of her injuries appeared to be inconsistent with Reyes's claim that he had acted alone. But a forensic pathologist who testified at the 1990 trial said that it was impossible to tell from the victim's injuries how many people had participated in the assault, as did New York City's chief medical examiner in 2002. Meili, who had no memory of what happened, said at the time of the settlement that she believed there had been more than one attacker and expressed her regret that the case had been settled.

Donald Trump also returned to the media, writing a 2014 opinion article for the New York Daily News. He said the settlement was "a disgrace", and that the men were likely guilty: "Settling doesn't mean innocence. ... Speak to the detectives on the case and try listening to the facts. These young men do not exactly have the pasts of angels." During his 2016 presidential campaign, Trump again said that the Central Park Five were guilty and that their convictions should not have been vacated. The men of the Central Park Five criticized Trump at the time for his statement, stating they had falsely confessed under police coercion. Other critics included U.S. Senator John McCain, who said that Trump's responses were "outrageous statements about the innocent men in the Central Park Five case". He cited this as among his reasons to retract his endorsement of the candidate. In June 2019 Trump stated he would not apologize, saying the Central Park Five "admitted their guilt".

Trisha Meili

The initial medical prognosis was that Meili would die of her injuries or remain in a permanent coma. She was given the last rites. Melli came out of her coma after 12 days, unable to talk, read, or walk. She was then treated for seven weeks in Metropolitan Hospital in East Harlem before being transferred to Gaylord Hospital, a long-term acute care center in Wallingford, Connecticut, where she spent six months in rehabilitation. She did not walk until mid-July 1989. She returned to work eight months after the attack. She largely recovered, with some lingering disabilities related to balance and loss of vision. As a result of the severe trauma, she had no memory of the attack or any events up to an hour before the assault, nor of the six weeks following the attack. During the trial of the defendants, Meili was not cross-examined due to the amnesia caused by her assault.

Meili returned to work at the investment bank. In April 2003, Meili confirmed her identity to the media when she published a memoir entitled I Am the Central Park Jogger: A Story of Hope and Possibility. She began a career as an inspirational speaker. She also works with victims of sexual assault and brain injury in the Mount Sinai Hospital sexual assault and violence intervention program. She had resumed jogging in 1989 three or four months after the attack, and over the years added a variety of other exercise and yoga practice. She continues to manifest some after-effects of the assault, including memory loss.

Lives of the Exonerated Five
After being released from prison in September 1996, Antron McCray moved to Maryland and became a forklift operator. He is married, has six children, and lives and works in Georgia.

Kevin Richardson is married and lives with his family in New Jersey. He has acted as an advocate with Santana and Salaam to reform New York State's criminal justice practices, advocating methods to prevent false confessions and eyewitness misidentifications. He has also participated in a series of talks on criminal-justice reform and wrongful convictions.

Yusef Salaam became a board member of the Innocence Project and has advocated for criminal-justice reform, particularly for juveniles. In 2016, he received a Lifetime Achievement Award from President Barack Obama. In 2017, he and Fernando Bermudez penned an op ed for the New York Daily News in support of two criminal-justice-reform measures offered by then-Governor Andrew Cuomo: one proposal would require police interrogations to be recorded from start to finish; the second would provide training to police officers to protect against misidentification. The budget proposal passed, and the video-recording requirement took effect April 1, 2018. Salaam started Yusef Speaks LLC and works as a motivational speaker.

Raymond Santana, Jr., was released from prison in December 1995, and was out of prison for six months before he was found guilty of possession of crack cocaine in 1998 and reincarcerated for a term of 3.5 to 7 years. He was released in 2002 when the prosecutor, agreeing that his sentence had been higher due to his (then-vacated) conviction for raping Meili, reduced it to the 18–48 months that would typically have been given to a first-time offender. Santana started a clothing company, Park Madison NYC, and donates a portion of Park Madison NYC's proceeds to the Innocence Project. Santana has also appeared with other involved men in presentations at local schools and colleges. 

After his release, Kharey Wise changed his first name to Korey; he found work as a construction worker and, for a time, as an office cleaner for Reverend Al Sharpton. Wise remained in New York City, where he works as a speaker and justice reform activist. He donated $190,000 of his 2014 settlement to the chapter of the Innocence Project at the University of Colorado Law School, to aid other wrongfully convicted people to gain exoneration; they renamed the project in his honor as the Korey Wise Innocence Project.

Legislative and other justice reforms
Because of the great publicity surrounding the case, the exoneration of the Central Park Five highlighted the issue of false confession. The issue of false confessions has become a major topic of study and efforts at criminal justice reform, particularly for juveniles. Juveniles have been found to make false confessions and guilty pleas at a much higher rate than adults.

Advances in DNA analysis and the work of non-profit groups such as the Innocence Project have resulted in 343 people being exonerated of their crimes from  due to DNA testing. This process has revealed the strong role of false confessions in wrongful convictions. According to a 2016 study by Craig J. Trocino, director of the Miami Law Innocence Clinic, 27 percent of those persons had "originally confessed to their crimes".

Members of the Five have been among activists who have advocated for videotaped interrogations and related reforms to try to prevent false confessions. Since 1989, New York and some 24 other states have passed laws requiring "electronic records of full interrogations". In some cases, this requirement is limited to certain types of crimes.

Contemporaneous cases compared by the media

The Central Park events, which were attributed at the time to members of the large group of youths who attacked numerous persons in the park, including whites, blacks and Hispanics, were covered as an extreme example of the violence that was occurring in the city, including assaults and robberies, rapes and homicides. Focusing on rapes in the same week as the one in Central Park, The New York Times reported on April 29, 1990, on the "28 other first-degree rapes or attempted rapes reported across New York City". The fourth one, on April 17, took place during the day in the park and is now tied to Reyes.

Later after the Central Park rape, when public attention was on the theory of a gang of young suspects, a brutal attack took place in Brooklyn on May 3, 1989. A 30-year-old black woman was robbed, raped and thrown from the roof of a four-story building by three young men. She fell 50 feet, suffering severe injuries. The incident received little media coverage in May 1989, when the focus was on the Central Park case. The woman's injuries required extensive hospitalization and rehabilitation.

The New York Times continued to report on the case, and followed up on prosecution of suspects. Tyrone Prescott, 17, Kelvin Furman, 22, and another young man, Darren Decotea (name corrected a few days later as Darron Decoteau), 17, were apprehended within two weeks and prosecuted for the crimes. They arranged plea deals with the prosecution in October 1990 before trial; the first two were sentenced to 6 to 18 years in prison. Decoteau had made a plea deal in February in which he agreed to testify against the other two. He was sentenced on October 10, 1990, to four to twelve years in prison. Social justice activists and critics have pointed to the lack of extensive coverage of the attack of the woman in Brooklyn as showing the media's racial bias; they have accused it of overlooking violence against minority women.

Representation in other media

 Ken Burns, Sarah Burns and her husband David McMahon premiered their The Central Park Five, a documentary film about the case, at the Cannes Film Festival in May 2012. Documentarian Ken Burns said he hoped the material of the film would push the city to settle the men's case against it. On September 12, 2012, attorneys for New York City subpoenaed the production company for access to the original footage in connection with its defense of the 2003 federal civil lawsuit brought against the city by three of the convicted youths. Celeste Koeleveld, the city's executive assistant corporation counsel for public safety, justified the subpoena on the grounds that the film had "crossed the line from journalism to advocacy" for the wrongfully convicted men. In February 2013, U.S. Judge Ronald L. Ellis quashed the city's subpoena.
 On May 31, 2019, When They See Us, a four-episode miniseries, was released on Netflix. Ava DuVernay co-wrote and directed the drama. Its release and wide viewing on Netflix prompted renewed discussion of the case, the criminal justice system, and of the lives of the five men.
 An opera, also called The Central Park Five, premiered in Long Beach, California, performed by the Long Beach Opera Company, on June 15, 2019. The music is by composer Anthony Davis and the libretto by Richard Wesley. Davis won the 2020 Pulitzer Prize for Music for this work. An earlier version, Five, had premiered in Newark, New Jersey, by the Trilogy Company.
An episode of the TLC series, American Justice, featured the Central Park Five and aired in 1999, which was before the Five were officially cleared of any wrongdoing in the case.  It attempts to get viewers to sympathize with the victim and portrays the Five as the actual attackers.  It was not until five years after this episode aired that Reyes confessed to the crime (and was proven guilty through DNA evidence).  The episode is now on YouTube but the series has not been aired on TV since the mid-2000s at least.

See also

 List of wrongful convictions in the United States
 Scottsboro Boys
 Martinsville Seven
 Willie McGee (convict)
 Groveland Four

References

Further reading
 Michael F. Armstrong, et al. (January 27, 2003) "NYPD Review of the Central Park Jogger Case"
 
 
 , opinion article by NYPD retired detective who disagreed with the exoneration and settlement
 
 
 
 
 Ryan, Nancy E. (December 5, 2002) "Affirmation in Response to Motion to Vacate Judgement of Conviction". Prosecution's detailed summary of the case after investigation following confession by Matias Reyes.
 
 

Editorials:

External links
 , court records including videos of confessions
 Case docket: In re McRay, Richardson, Santana, Wise and Salaam Litigation, December 2003 filing of lawsuit against NYC
 , 1 hr, 28 minutes

1980s crimes in New York City
1989 crimes in the United States
1989 in New York City
1990 controversies in the United States
1990s trials
1980s in Manhattan
African-American history in New York City
African-American-related controversies
April 1989 crimes
April 1989 events in the United States
Jogger case
Crimes in Manhattan
Donald Trump controversies
False confessions
Incidents of violence against women
Mass media-related controversies in the United States
Media bias controversies
Overturned convictions in the United States
People wrongfully convicted of rape
Race and crime in the United States
Race-related controversies in the United States
Rape in the 1980s
Rape trials in the United States
Rapes in the United States
Robberies in the United States
20th-century American trials
History of women in New York City
Women in New York City